Malemort is a commune in the Corrèze department of southern France. The municipality was established on 1 January 2016 and consists of the former communes of Malemort-sur-Corrèze and Venarsal.

Population

See also 
Communes of the Corrèze department

References 

Communes of Corrèze
States and territories established in 2016
Populated places established in 2016